Roger Barbour (fl. 1415) was an English politician.

He was a Member (MP) of the Parliament of England for Devizes in 1415.

References

14th-century births
15th-century deaths
English MPs 1415